Jan Donner (3 February 1891 – 2 February 1981) was a Dutch politician of the defunct Anti-Revolutionary Party (ARP) now merged into the Christian Democratic Appeal (CDA) and jurist. He was granted the honorary title of Minister of State on 16 December 1971.

Donner was Minister of Justice from 1926 to 1933, President of the Dutch Supreme Court from 1946 to 1961, and was named Minister of State in 1971 for his services to the State.

In 1941 he became member of the Royal Netherlands Academy of Arts and Sciences.

He was the father of the chess player Jan Hein Donner and the jurist André Donner, and the grandfather of the former Minister of Social Affairs and Employment Piet Hein Donner.

Decorations

References

External links

  Mr.Dr. J. (Jan) Donner Parlement & Politiek

1891 births
1981 deaths
Anti-Revolutionary Party politicians
Commanders of the Order of the Netherlands Lion
Dutch legal writers
20th-century Dutch judges
Dutch people of World War II
Dutch political writers
Dutch prisoners of war in World War II
Dutch resistance members
Knights Grand Cross of the Order of Orange-Nassau
Members of the Royal Netherlands Academy of Arts and Sciences
Ministers of Justice of the Netherlands
Ministers of State (Netherlands)
People from Assen
Presidents of the Supreme Court of the Netherlands
Reformed Churches Christians from the Netherlands
Supreme Court of the Netherlands justices
Utrecht University alumni
Academic staff of Utrecht University
World War II prisoners of war held by Germany
World War II civilian prisoners
20th-century Dutch civil servants
20th-century Dutch educators
20th-century Dutch male writers
20th-century Dutch politicians